Daryaganj (literally "A market near a river") is a neighbourhood of Delhi inside the walled city of Shahjahanabad (Old Delhi). The "darya" (lit. "River") refers to the river Yamuna which was just outside the walled city. Daryaganj is one of the three sub-divisions and also the administrative headquarters of the Central Delhi District. It starts at Delhi Gate, at the edge of Netaji Subhash Road, which goes towards Red Fort.

History

Daryaganj had the original cantonment of Delhi, after 1803, where a native regiment of Delhi garrison was stationed, which was later shifted to Ridge area. Now known as New Darya Ganj, it once formed part of the British Darya Ganj Cantonment,  one of the earliest establishments of the British in Old Delhi. The New Darya Ganj market was earlier known as Faiz Bazaar until the partition, when present traders moved into the area. East of Daryaganj was Raj ghat Gate of the walled city, opening at Raj Ghat on Yamuna River. The Phool Mandi (Flower Market) of Daryaganj was established around 1869, and even today despite serving a small geographical area, it is of great importance, due to dense population.
As the new capital New Delhi was being built after 1911, Daryaganj along with Paharganj were only two buffer areas between the new city, and the older city, which started being called the "walled city" by 1931, with Daryaganj sitting at the edge of the walled city near Dilli Gate.

Overview

Daryaganj continues to be a major commercial hub of modern Old Delhi. Netaji Subhash Road that begins from Delhi Gate and goes towards the historic Red Fort, Jama Masjid and Chandni Chowk, passes through the middle of the area, which is a short walk away.

The area also has a number of eye hospitals and clinics, including Dr. Shroff's Charity Eye Hospital, which opened in 1917. The district bustles with shoppers from Monday to Saturday, and on Sunday is home to India's largest platform market for magazines and second-hand books.

Daryaganj is also famous for its all-time favourite markets like the Sunday Book Market or the Kitab Bazaar (Book Market) that is held every Sunday on street pavements, (Sunday being weekly holiday for the shops). The market established around 1964, today stretches almost for 2 kilometers, and one may find books on virtually any topic, here at throwaway prices.
Books of all streams, genres are available in this Sunday Book Market.
The former President of Pakistan, Pervez Musharraf was born and used to live at Nehar Wali Haveli in Daryaganj before migrating to Pakistan after the Partition of India in 1947.

Darya Ganj today is quite well known all over the country, thanks to the number of book publishers who have their offices here. Ranging from S. Chand & Co. to Prentice Hall India, to Oxford University Press, mostly on Ansari Road, an inner road on the eastern side Daryaganj and is neighboring areas. Daryaganj is also home the Hans, a Hindi literary magazine, restarted by writer Rajendra Yadav in 1986, founded by Premchand, a pioneer in Hindi literature.

Darya Ganj has one major cinema hall called Golcha, which opened in 1954, one of oldest cinemas of Delhi.

Darya Ganj has the first co-education school  of Delhi, Happy School, located on Padam Chand Marg.

Cuisine
Daryaganj also has what was once the only restaurant of Old Delhi, the Moti Mahal founded by Kundan Lal Jaggi, Thakur Das Mago and Kundan Lal Gujral, most known for the invention of butter chicken and modern dal makhani. Another notable modern restaurant is  Chor Bizarre near Delite cinema, which serves Kashmiri cuisine. and hotel to zaika foods restaurant and caterers

Headquarters
The Headquarters of the Office of the Grand Mufti and Islamic Community of India are located in Ansari Road.

References

External links

 

Neighbourhoods in Delhi
District subdivisions of Delhi
Subdivisions of Central Delhi District